Gainesville is a rural unincorporated community in northeastern Allen County, Kentucky, United States.

References

Unincorporated communities in Allen County, Kentucky
Unincorporated communities in Kentucky